William Ellis Corey (May 4, 1866 – May 11, 1934) was president of the Carnegie Steel Company from 1901 to 1903, and was president of U.S. Steel from 1903 to 1911.

Biography 
He was born in Braddock, Pennsylvania in 1866.
In 1883 he married Laura Cook, whom he met when she worked for his family, and they had one son, Allan Corey.  In 1906, Laura filed for divorce in Reno, Nevada, charging that William had deserted her in May 1905. Laura was awarded custody of Allan and a settlement of $3,000,000 (approximately $ today).   After the divorce, William married an actress, Mabelle Gilman on May 14, 1907, and in 1914 Laura married Lenn A. Duckworth. In 1911, Corey resigned his position as president of U.S. Steel.  In 1923, Mabelle and William were divorced.

He died in Manhattan, New York City on May 11, 1934.

City of Corey, Alabama 
The city of Fairfield, Alabama was originally named for Corey in 1910 by the Tennessee Coal, Iron and Railroad Company, which built the city as a model city for workers at the company's nearby Fairfield Works. The negative publicity from Corey's divorce prompted U.S. Steel, who had taken over TCI, to rename the city for the company president's hometown in Connecticut.

References 

1866 births
1934 deaths
American industrialists
People from Braddock, Pennsylvania